Waldemar Romuald Szadny (born 8 May 1961 in Gorzów Wielkopolski) is a Polish politician. He was elected to the Sejm on 25 September 2005, getting 5941 votes in 8 Zielona Góra district as a candidate from the Civic Platform list.

See also
Members of Polish Sejm 2005-2007

External links
Waldemar Szadny - parliamentary page - includes declarations of interest, voting record, and transcripts of speeches.

Members of the Polish Sejm 2005–2007
Civic Platform politicians
1961 births
Living people